Hope in Forgotten Places is the fourth solo EP by jazz pianist Mike Garson, released in 2007 via his Myspace site.

Track listing
Hope In Forgotten places
Less Is More
Thank You
Chaos in Brooklyn

References

External links
  Hope in Forgotten Places – Myspace site-  EP download
 mikegarson.com Official Website with Discography

2007 EPs
Mike Garson albums